Gharib Dust (also Romanized as Gharīb Dūst; also known as Qarīb Dūst) is a village in Barvanan-e Gharbi Rural District, Torkamanchay District, Meyaneh County, East Azerbaijan Province, Iran. At the 2006 census, its population was 381, in 89 families.

References 

Populated places in Meyaneh County